Gustav Iden (born 1 May 1996) is a professional Norwegian triathlete. He is a 2022 Ironman World champion and he is a two-time winner of the Ironman 70.3 World Championship, winning in 2019 and 2021. At the 2020 Summer Olympics in Tokyo, Japan, Iden placed 8th in the men's triathlon.

In 2018, he was part of a world-first Norwegian 1-2-3 with Casper Stornes and Kristian Blummenfelt finishing ahead of him in first and second place respectively at WTS Bermuda.

Iden's achievements in the Norwegian championships include national titles in both triathlon and duathlon from 2014.

Personal life
Iden was born in Bergen on 1 May 1996.

References

External links
 
 
 
 

1996 births
Living people
Sportspeople from Bergen
Norwegian male triathletes
Norwegian male long-distance runners
Triathletes at the 2015 European Games
European Games competitors for Norway
Triathletes at the 2020 Summer Olympics
Olympic triathletes of Norway